The Tropical Championships also called the Tropical Sectional Championships was a mens open tennis tournament founded in 1887 as the St. Augustine Lawn Tennis Tournament. It was staged annually at the St. Augustine Lawn Tennis Club, St. Augustine, Florida, United States until 1894.

History
In March 1887 the St. Augustine Lawn Tennis Tournament was inaugurated at the St. Augustine Lawn Tennis Club, St. Augustine, Florida, United States, and the first men's champion was Thomas Sterling Beckwith. In 1888 its name was changed to the Tropical Championships. 

The championships were part of the USNLTA Circuit from 1887 until 1894. The tournament was played on outdoor hard asphalt courts except for the 1888 edition when it was played on indoor wood courts, The tournament was mainly won by American players except for 1892 when the English tennis player Charles Walder Grinstead won the event. In 1894 the championships were discontinued the final singles champion was Oliver Campbell.

References

Hard court tennis tournaments
Wood court tennis tournaments
Defunct tennis tournaments in the United States